Regent Power is a Private Limited company incorporated in 2007 and a concern of Habib Group of Chittagong. The plant is located at Barabkunda in Chittagong under independent power producers (IPP) arrangement of the government. Regent Power is operating on natural gas  with the capacity to produce 22 MW.

See also

Electricity sector in Bangladesh
List of power stations in Bangladesh
Electricity

References

External links
Regent Power Limited website

Electric power companies of Bangladesh